Louis Cousin, le président Cousin (21 August 1627  – 26 February 1707) was a French translator, historian, lawyer, royal censor and president of the cour des monnaies.

Cousin was born and died in Paris.  He was the third member elected to occupy seat 3 of the Académie française in 1697.

Bibliography 
Histoire de Constantinople depuis le règne de Justin jusqu’à la fin de l'Empire, traduite sur les originaux grecs par Cousin (8 volumes, 1672–1685)
Histoire de l'Église, écrite par Eusèbe, traduite par M. Cousin (4 volumes, 1675–1676)
Les Principes et les règles de la vie chrétienne, traité composé en latin par M. le cardinal Bona et traduit en françois par M. Cousin (1675)
Histoire romaine, écrite par Xiphilin, par Zonare et par Zosime, traduite sur les originaux grecs par M. Cousin (1678)
Histoire de l'Empire d'Occident de Xiphilin, traduite par le président Cousin (2 volumes, 1683)
Discours de Clément Alexandrin pour exhorter les payens à embrasser la religion chrétienne, traduit par Mr Cousin (1684)
Discours d'Eusèbe, touchant les miracles attribués par les payens à Apollonius de Thyane, traduit par M. Cousin (1684)
La Morale de Confucius, philosophe de la Chine (1688). Attribué. Texte en ligne
Histoire de plusieurs saints des maisons des comtes de Tonnerre et de Clermont (1698)

References 

 

1627 births
1707 deaths
Writers from Paris
French economists
17th-century French historians
Members of the Académie Française
French male non-fiction writers
17th-century French translators
17th-century journalists